Designed by Frank Meline and built in 1917 at the behest of J.E. Ransford, the Garden Court Apartments in Los Angeles, California was the last word in Hollywood high-style living. It had two ballrooms, a billiard room, and many suites featuring oriental carpets, oil paintings, and grand pianos. Some of the Garden Court's notable residents include Clara Bow, Louis B. Mayer, Carl Laemmle, Mack Sennett, Stan Laurel, John Gilbert, and Mae Murray. 

The four-story, 190-room Garden Court was designed in the Beaux Arts style, and its figural corbels on the exterior, supporting the second-story molding, were an integral part of the style. The Garden Court also featured tennis courts on the Sycamore Avenue side of the property. Later, that area become a rental car facility.

Its fortunes declined in the '60s and '70s, along with those of Hollywood Boulevard in general. The Garden Court became the rallying point for Hollywood preservation. In the '70s and '80s, numerous plans had been announced and fundraisers held to make a film museum of the building, but to no avail. The site was purchased with a plan to build a 13-story copper glass building there. Numerous lawsuits were filed based on disputes regarding the sale. 

Although a successful designation of the structure as a Los Angeles Cultural Heritage Monument and a full environmental impact report emphasizing the architectural rarity of the structures style would seem sufficient to save the building, it succumbed to casual residency and fire damage. After being vacated in 1980, it was inhabited by homeless squatters and nicknamed "Hotel Hell". It was torn down in 1984.

The copper glass building was never built. A subsequent building named the Hollywood Galaxy was built and was the home of the Hollywood Entertainment Museum until it closed in 2007.

The Garden Court Apartments was noted in the National Register of Historic Places on October 21, 1982, with reference number 820004981 and listing status "DO".

Its architect, Frank Meline, also designed a building that is one of Santa Monica's designated historic landmarks.

Responding to the demolition (and faced with the demolition of many other important buildings along Hollywood Boulevard) Hollywood Heritage Inc. submitted all the qualifying buildings on the street from La Brea Avenue on the west to Argyle Boulevard on the East to be a historic district on the National Register. It was designed as such in 1985, giving preservation another tool by which to preserve the area. It is now known as the Hollywood Boulevard Commercial and Entertainment District on the U.S. National Register of Historical Places.

References

External links
 Photos  at the Los Angeles Public Library

Apartment buildings in Los Angeles
1920 in California
Los Angeles Historic-Cultural Monuments
Beaux-Arts architecture in California
Buildings and structures demolished in 1984
Residential buildings completed in 1917